Bertengeh O. "Yemi" Gadri-Nicholson (born June 7, 1983) is an American former professional basketball player. He played college basketball for the Denver Pioneers.

Early life
Nicholson was born in Oregon to parents who had immigrated from Sierra Leone. He lived in Texas before moving to Colorado in 1994 where he attended Overland High School. Nicholson almost failed to make his high school basketball team and instead possessed greater abilities as a saxophone player. He earned a scholarship to study music at Fort Lewis College.

College career
He walked-on the Fort Lewis basketball team midway through his freshman year and played for three minutes in one game during the 2001–02 season.

Nicholson was playing a pickup game in Denver, Colorado, in 2002 when he was noticed by Denver Pioneers player Rodney Billups. Billups recommended Nicholson to Pioneers head coach Terry Carroll who invited Nicholson to join the team. Nicholson sat out the 2002–03 season as a redshirt. 

Nicholson had a paltry debut with the Pioneers during the 2003–04 season and averaged 7.5 points and 4.3 rebounds per game. He had a breakthrough season in 2004–05 as he averaged 18.1 points and 8.4 rebounds per game. Nicholson was named as the 2005 Sun Belt Player of the Year. He received frequent attention of National Basketball Association (NBA) scouts during his senior season in 2005–06. Nicholson averaged a league-best 19.8 points per game and was selected as the 2006 Sun Belt Defensive Player of the Year.

Professional career
Nicholson participated at the 2006 NBA Pre-Draft Camp. He was not selected in the 2006 NBA draft and joined the Sacramento Kings for the 2006 NBA Summer League where he played sparingly.

Nicholson began his professional career with Belfius Mons-Hainaut in Belgium in the 2006–07 season. He played for the Austin Toros during the 2007–08 season where he averaged 2.3 points and 1.0 rebounds per game. Nicholson also played in Poland, Germany, Spain and the Czech Republic.

References

External links
College statistics

1983 births
Living people
African-American basketball players
American expatriate basketball people in Belgium
American expatriate basketball people in Germany
American expatriate basketball people in Poland
American expatriate basketball people in Spain
American expatriate basketball people in the Czech Republic
American men's basketball players
American people of Sierra Leonean descent
Austin Toros players
Basketball players from Colorado
Belfius Mons-Hainaut players
Centers (basketball)
Czarni Słupsk players
Denver Pioneers men's basketball players
Eisbären Bremerhaven players
Fort Lewis Skyhawks men's basketball players
Sportspeople from Aurora, Colorado
Trefl Sopot players